Arnaud Kalimuendo-Muinga (born 20 January 2002), known as Arnaud Kalimuendo, is a French professional footballer who plays as a forward for  club Rennes.

Club career

Paris Saint-Germain

Youth career and pro debut 
Born in Suresnes, Kalimuendo joined Paris Saint-Germain (PSG) from FC Saint Cloud in July 2012. There he debuted with the under-19 squad in the UEFA Youth League, aged only 16, under the direction of Thiago Motta, becoming one of the leaders of the youth sides. Kalimuendo signed his first professional contract with the club on 8 July 2019, a deal that was set to expire on 30 June 2022. On 10 September 2020, Kalimuendo made his official debut for Paris Saint-Germain in a 1–0 loss against Lens.

2020–21: First loan to Lens 
On 5 October 2020, Kalimuendo signed a contract extension with Paris Saint-Germain until June 2024, and joined Lens on a season-long loan deal. He made his debut in a 4–0 loss to rivals Lille on 18 October, and scored his first goal in a 1–0 win against Dijon on 22 November. His third goal for Lens came on 5 December in a 2–0 victory against Rennes. By scoring his third goal for the club, he became the first Lens player in 70 years to score in his first three games as a starter in Ligue 1.

2021–22: Second loan to Lens 
On 10 June 2021, it was made official by Lens that Kalimuendo would return to PSG following the end of his loan deal. His first appearance back at Paris Saint-Germain came in a 1–0 loss to Lille in the Trophée des Champions on 1 August 2021. However, on transfer deadline day on 31 August, Kalimuendo returned to Lens on loan for the remainder of the season. On 1 October, he scored his first two goals of the season in a 2–0 win over Reims. It was the first brace of his career. Across his two loan spells at Lens, Kalimuendo scored 21 goals in 65 matches for the club.

Rennes 
On 11 August 2022, Kalimuendo joined Ligue 1 side Rennes.

International career 
Kalimuendo represents France at international level. He finished third with the U17 side at the FIFA U-17 World Cup in Brazil in 2019, scoring a hat-trick in the third-place play-off to beat the Netherlands by a score of 3–1.

On 24 May 2021, Kalimuendo was called up for the Under-21 Euros by coach Sylvain Ripoll after Randal Kolo Muani was removed from the squad due to playing the Ligue 1 relegation/promotion play-offs with Nantes.

Personal life 
Born in France, Kalimuendo is of DR Congolese descent.

Career statistics

Honours 
Paris Saint-Germain

 Ligue 1: 2021–22
 Trophée des Champions: 2022

France U17
 FIFA U-17 World Cup third place: 2019

Individual
 Titi d'Or: 2020

References

External links

 
 
 
 
 
 

2002 births
Living people
Sportspeople from Suresnes
French footballers
France youth international footballers
France under-21 international footballers
Association football forwards
Paris Saint-Germain F.C. players
RC Lens players
Stade Rennais F.C. players
Ligue 1 players
Black French sportspeople
French sportspeople of Democratic Republic of the Congo descent
Footballers from Hauts-de-Seine